Montreux '77 is an album by pianist Tommy Flanagan. It is a trio recording, with bassist Keter Betts and drummer Bobby Durham.

Recording
The album was recorded during a concert performance at the Montreux Jazz Festival in Switzerland on July 13, 1977.

Releases
The album was released by Pablo Records. A subsequent CD reissue had one track – "Heat Wave" – added.

Track listing
"Barbados" (Charlie Parker) – 9:25 	
"Some Other Spring/Easy Living" – 8:28 	
"Star Crossed Lovers/Jump for Joy" (Duke Ellington, Billy Strayhorn) – 6:56 	
"Woody 'N You" (Dizzy Gillespie) – 5:42
"Blue Bossa" (Kenny Dorham) – 8:08 	

Additional track on CD reissue
"Heat Wave" (Irving Berlin) – 8:25

Personnel
Tommy Flanagan – piano
Keter Betts – bass
Bobby Durham – drums

References

1977 live albums
Pablo Records live albums
Tommy Flanagan live albums
Albums produced by Norman Granz
Albums recorded at the Montreux Jazz Festival